Iu-miteru (iw-mitrw/jw-mjtrw - the island in the river) was an ancient Egyptian town in the fourth Upper Egyptian nome, near Gebelein. The town is often mentioned in Ancient Egyptian texts and was the place for a temple for Sobek. From an inscription found at the Wadi Hammamat it seems certain that the place was at the Southern border of the Fourth Upper Egyptian nome. Modern identification of the location of Iu-Miteru remains uncertain. The ruins of a temple of Sobek were discovered in Naga' Awlad Dahmash (Rizeiqat), which could thus be the ancient Iu-miteru.

Old Kingdom 
In the 6th Dynasty, a letter mentions the estate.

Second Intermediate Period 
In the Second Intermediate Period, the Temple of Sobek at Iumiteru meaning Island on the River, saw attention from Sobekhotep Amenemhat.

At the temple, there was a wab-priest of Iumiteru (wꜥb n Jw-mjtrw). Two people are known with this title Resseneb  and sn(⸗j)-rs.

Another title known from the site is Man of Iumutru (s n jw-mjtrw) named Neferhotep.

References

Further reading 
Wojciech Ejsmond (2017) The Necropolis of Er-Rizeiqat, Ägypten und Levante / Egypt and the Levant, Vol. 27 (2017), pp. 241-248

Cities in ancient Egypt
Former populated places in Egypt